Hugh Gillan (died 19 May 1798) was a Scottish physician.

Hugh Gillan was born in Scotland. He became a doctor of medicine of University of Edinburgh in 1786.

Hugh Gillan joined the 1793 Macartney Embassy to China as a physician. The embassy was led by George Macartney, 1st Earl Macartney.

Honors
He was admitted a Licentiate of the Royal College of Physicians 1795. He was admitted a fellow of the Royal Society in 1795.

References

Further reading
 Gillan, Hugh. 'Mr Gillan's Observations on the State of Medicine, Surgery, and Chemistry in China', in J. L. Cranmer-Byng (ed.), An Embassy to China: Being the Journal kept by Lord Macartney During his Embassy to the Emperor Ch'ien-lung 1793-1794 (London, 1962), 279–90.
 

1798 deaths
Alumni of the University of Edinburgh Medical School
Fellows of the Royal Society
18th-century Scottish medical doctors